Wissem Ben Yahia (born 9 September 1984) is a professional footballer who plays as a midfielder for Club Africain. Born in France, he represented Tunisia at international level.

Club career
In July 2011, Ben Yahia signed a three-year contract with Turkish Süper Lig side Mersin İdmanyurdu.

In July 2014, he signed a two-year contract with TFF First League side Gaziantep Büyükşehir Belediyespor.

International career
He was part of the Tunisian 2004 Olympic football team who exited in the first round, finishing third in Group C, behind group and gold medal winners Argentina and runners-up Australia. He has also appeared in several friendlies with the Tunisia national football team.

International goals
Scores and results list Tunisia's goal tally first.

References

External links

1984 births
Living people
Footballers from Paris
Association football midfielders
Citizens of Tunisia through descent
Tunisian footballers
French footballers
French expatriate footballers
Tunisian expatriate footballers
Tunisia international footballers
French sportspeople of Tunisian descent
Mersin İdman Yurdu footballers
Gaziantep F.K. footballers
Club Africain players
Süper Lig players
TFF First League players
Tunisian Ligue Professionnelle 1 players
Olympic footballers of Tunisia
Footballers at the 2004 Summer Olympics
2011 African Nations Championship players
2012 Africa Cup of Nations players
2013 Africa Cup of Nations players
Tunisian expatriate sportspeople in Turkey
French expatriate sportspeople in Turkey
Expatriate footballers in Turkey
Tunisia A' international footballers